Leila Afua Djansi (born 1981) is an American and Ghanaian filmmaker who started her film career in the Ghana film industry.

Early life
Leila Djansi was born Leila Afua Djansi in 1981. Her father was a pilot and her mother a Senior Nursing Officer. Djansi grew up in India and Ghana. Although acting and writing were her hobbies, her career ambition was to become a gynecologist, a plan that later changed when she developed an interest in forensics. Ready to delve into the field of criminology, another career change occurred when she met the Ghanaian actor Sam Odoi, who convinced her to write a script for him. She was 19 years old when her script Babina was made into a movie by Producer Akwetey Kanyi.

Education 
Djansi attended the Kabore Primary and JSS, Mawuli School for primary, junior and secondary education respectively all located in Ho, in the Volta Region of Ghana.

She began her film education at the National Film and Television School, but left Ghana for the United States to continue her Film and Television Degree at Savannah College of Art and Design on an artistic Honors Scholarship.

Career
President of the Ghana Library Board Readers club for three years, her sojourn in the industry began when she was a runner-up in a regional beauty pageant in 1998.

She took a job with Socrates Safo's Movie Africa Productions, where she worked as a Writer/Line Producer. While with the company, she wrote Ghana's first Gay/Lesbian rights screenplay, The Sisterhood, a film that included the late Ghanaian screen actress Suzzy Williams.  Djansi worked with the state-owned Gama Film Company, where she wrote and produced Legacy of love.

In the United States, she established Turning Point Pictures, an independent production company geared towards social issue films.

Awards and recognition
Djansi's first film was awarded a 2009 worldFest Platinum Award; the film, Grass Between My Lips, is a story of female circumcision and early marriage, set in a northern Ghana village.In 2010, her debut feature, I Sing of a Well was nominated for 11 African Movie Academy Awards. The film won 3 awards: Best Sound, Best Costume and the Jury Special Award for Over-All Best Film. 
In 2011, Djansi was presented with the BAFTA/LA Pan African Film Festival Choice Award for the film I Sing of a Well.
 
Djansi's 2011 film Sinking Sands received 10 African Movie Academy Award nominations, with Ama K Abebrese winning the Best Actress Award and Djansi earning the Best Original Screenplay Award. At the first Ghana Movie Awards in 2011, Djansi's Sinking Sands received awards for "Best Art Direction", "Best Costume", "Best West African Film" and "Best Picture". Sinking Sands was nominated in 14 categories.

Djansi's third directorial effort Ties That Bind received a Black Reel Awards Nomination in 2012. The film also won the Best Diaspora film at the 2012 San Diego Black Film Festival.

In 2016, Djansi directed Like Cotton Twines, an exploration of the practice of Trokosi in her native Ghana. The film was nominated for "Best World Fiction Film" at the Los Angeles Film Festival.

Djansi's work and contribution to the Ghana film industry has been recognized by UNiFEM Ghana, The African Women Development Fund, The Ghana Musicians Association and other social issue minded communities.

References

External links

Turning Point Pictures
Keisha Hatchett, "Interview: Like Cotton Twines Filmmaker Leila Djansi on Slavery, Black Unity and Diversity in Hollywood", The Mary Sue, 20 January 2017.
Stephen Saito, "LA Film Fest '16 Interview: Leila Djansi on Untangling 'Like Cotton Twines, The Moveable Fest, 15 June 2016.

1981 births
Living people
Ghanaian film directors
Ghanaian women film directors
Ghanaian film producers
Ghanaian women film producers
Ghanaian screenwriters
Ghanaian women screenwriters
Mawuli School alumni